Christian CND (CCND) is a 'Specialist Section' of CND, the Campaign for Nuclear Disarmament and has existed since 1960. CCND is made up of individual Christians of various denominations who oppose nuclear weapons and who campaign for peace. The organisation has an elected executive of ten members, has an office in London and publishes a journal called 'Ploughshare' four times a year. Its symbol combines the original CND sign (commonly referred to as the 'Peace' sign) with images of a cross and a dove holding an olive branch.

Christian CND is a member of the Network of Christian Peace Organisations.

NOTE. College CND also used the abbreviation CCND.

History
Founded in 1960, chaired by Sidney Hinkes from 1964.

In 1981 it was expanded and reorganised on a more permanent basis with its own membership, newsletter and administration, and considerable autonomy in forming its own policies. It organised many conferences at local and national level as well as acts of protest, liturgies and services at bases and government sites. Its members were also involved in letter writing, lobbying and educating for peace and disarmament. There were also several Christian CND local groups around the UK.

References

External links
 Christian CND website
Catalogue of the CCND archives, held at the Modern Records Centre, University of Warwick

Campaign for Nuclear Disarmament
Anti-nuclear organizations
Christian organisations based in the United Kingdom
Organizations established in 1960
1960 in politics
Christian political organizations
1960 in British politics
1960 in Christianity